Joaquín Botero Vaca (born 10 December 1977) is a Bolivian former professional footballer who played as a striker.

He is the second all-time top goalscorer for the Bolivia national team with 20 goals, and was the top goalscorer in world football in the 2002 season, with 49 goals scored for Club Bolívar.

Club career
Botero not only played in Bolivia's football league, he also played abroad, in the football leagues of Mexico, Argentina and Venezuela.

After scoring 133 goals for Club Bolívar and becoming the club's second highest goalscorer of all time behind Luis Fernando Salinas, he left the club to play abroad.

Botero's first foreign club was the Mexican team Pumas. In his first season with Pumas, the 2003 Apertura, he scored three goals in 17 games. After scoring another three in nine games in the 2004 Clausura, Botero broke out in the 2004 Apertura, registering 11 goals in 19 games.

In 2006, he joined San Lorenzo de Almagro of the Primera División de Argentina and in 2007 he played for Deportivo Táchira of Venezuela. After an unsuccessful stint in both clubs, Botero returned to Bolívar as a free agent in 2008.

He joined the Mexican team Correcaminos UAT for the Clausura 2009 season, marking his return to Mexico.

In January 2010, he was loaned out to Al Arabi Kuwait for $170,000. He made four appearances and scored three goals.

In 2011, Botero returned to his country to play for San José and Sport Boys Warnes; in the latter, he was the author of two goals that allowed promotion of the team to the First Division of Bolivia for the first time. In this team, he played until his retirement in 2014.

For six years and after his retirement, Botero decided to dedicate himself to personal activities and projects. However, in 2020 he announced his return to the fields, playing for Club Universidad San Francisco de Asís of the Primera A de Potosí in Tupiza, Bolivia.

International career
Since 1999, Botero was a regular player for the Bolivia national team, including participations in the 1999 FIFA Confederations Cup, in which he played in all three of Bolivia's group stage matches, the 2001 Copa América and the 2004 Copa América. 

On 1 April 2009, Botero scored a hat-trick for Bolivia in a historic 6–1 victory over Argentina in a 2010 FIFA World Cup qualifier, Argentina's first loss under the recently appointed manager, Diego Maradona. On 15 May 2009, Botero surprisingly announced the end of his era with the national team, putting as an excuse that his motivation "was not there anymore". 

In his ten years playing for Bolivia, Botero earned a total of 48 caps and scored 20 goals, becoming the highest scorer in the national team's history, before being surpassed by Marcelo Moreno in 2020. 

Botero represented his country in 30 FIFA World Cup qualification matches, scoring 16 goals.

Career statistics

Scores and results list Bolivia's goal tally first, score column indicates score after each Botero goal.

Honours
Bolívar
 Liga de Fútbol Profesional Boliviano: 2002

UNAM
 Primera División de México: 2004 (C), 2004 (A)

Individual
 Liga de Fútbol Profesional Boliviano: 2002 Topscorer (49 goals)
 Liga de Fútbol Profesional Boliviano: World's Best Top Division Goal Scorer of the Year (49 goals)

See also 
 Bolivia national football team

References

External links

1977 births
Living people
Footballers from La Paz
Association football forwards
Bolivian footballers
Bolivia international footballers
1999 FIFA Confederations Cup players
2001 Copa América players
2004 Copa América players
Club Bolívar players
Club Universidad Nacional footballers
San Lorenzo de Almagro footballers
Deportivo Táchira F.C. players
Correcaminos UAT footballers
Al-Arabi SC (Kuwait) players
Club San José players
Liga MX players
Bolivian expatriate footballers
Expatriate footballers in Mexico
Expatriate footballers in Argentina
Expatriate footballers in Venezuela
Expatriate footballers in Kuwait
Kuwait Premier League players
Bolivian expatriate sportspeople in Kuwait
Bolivian expatriate sportspeople in Venezuela
Bolivian expatriate sportspeople in Argentina
Bolivian expatriate sportspeople in Mexico